The Opened Shutters is a 1914 American silent drama film directed by Otis Turner and starring William Worthington, Frank Lloyd and Herbert Rawlinson. It is based on a novel by Clara Louise Burnham. It was remade as Opened Shutters in 1921, directed by William Worthington who had starred in this film.

Cast
 William Worthington as Thinkright Johnson
 Frank Lloyd as Judge Calvin Trent
 Herbert Rawlinson as John Dunham
 Ann Little as Sylvia Lacey 
 Betty Schade as Edna Derwent
 Cora Drew as Miss Martha Lacey

References

Bibliography
 Langman, Larry. American Film Cycles: The Silent Era. Greenwood Publishing, 1998.

External links
 

1914 films
1914 drama films
1910s English-language films
American silent feature films
Silent American drama films
American black-and-white films
Universal Pictures films
Films directed by Otis Turner
1910s American films